The  Colorado Crush season was the tenth season for the professional indoor football franchise and eighth in the Indoor Football League (IFL). It was the first season of the franchise being labeled the Crush after playing the previous nine seasons under the Ice moniker. One of ten teams that competed in the IFL for the 2016 season, the Crush were members of the Intense Conference.

Led by head coach Heron O'Neal, the Crush played their home games at the Budweiser Events Center in Loveland, Colorado.

Schedule
Key:

Regular season
All start times are local time

Standings

Roster

References

Colorado Crush
Colorado Crush (IFL)
Colorado Crush